Daniel Garibay (born February 14, 1973) is a retired Major League Baseball player from Mexico who played pitcher in ; he played for the Chicago Cubs. Garibay was 27 when he made his MLB debut for the Cubs. He pitched as both a starter and relief pitcher. He compiled a 6.03 ERA in 74.2 IP.

External links

1973 births
Baseball players from Baja California
Chicago Cubs players
Living people
Major League Baseball players from Mexico
Major League Baseball pitchers
Mexican expatriate baseball players in the United States